LaRose is a novel by the Ojibwe author Louise Erdrich, published in 2016 by HarperCollins. The book received positive reviews from multiple publications, including The New York Times, The Kansas City Star, Winnipeg Free Press, The Philadelphia Inquirer, The Washington Post, The A.V. Club, The Sydney Morning Herald, USA Today, and The Chronicle Herald. It won the 2016 National Book Critics Circle Award in fiction. The novel features the same setting as Erdrich's 2012 novel The Round House.

Plot summary 
LaRose is set in North Dakota on an Ojibwe reservation in the "era of George W. Bush and 9/11." The novel's protagonist is LaRose Iron, a young Native American boy. His father, Landreaux Iron, accidentally shoots LaRose's best friend and neighbor, Dusty Ravich, also 5 years old, in a hunting accident, when the buck Landreaux had aimed at suddenly moved from in front of the boy.

Dusty's parents, Peter and Nola, are devastated by his death. To compensate for their loss, following an ancient custom, LaRose's parents, Landreaux and Emmaline, give him to Dusty's family after speaking with a priest and visiting a sweat lodge, to find a way to resolve their guilt.

While Peter and Nola are initially reluctant to accept LaRose into their family, perceiving it as an act of betrayal towards their own dead son, they soon warm to him. LaRose later helps protect Nola as she deals with suicidal ideation.

The story also introduces the stories of several of LaRose's ancestors, who were sent to residential schools and endured many traumatic experiences. The first person in the family to be named LaRose, an Ojibwe woman, was a young girl in 1839 when her mother sold her at a trading post. She is raped and later participates in the murder of her rapist. After her death, her remains are stolen by "white 'scientists."

Critical reception 
The book received primarily favorable reviews. USA Today gave it 3.5 out of 4 stars, while The Sydney Morning Herald described it as a "page-turner," The Kansas City Star described it as "brutally beautiful," and The A.V. Club described it as "everything you want a novel to be." LaRose was described by The Washington Post as a "masterly tale of grief and love" and by The Philadelphia Inquirer described it as a "brilliant, subtle exploration of tragic histories."

Awards and honors
2016 National Book Critics Circle Award for Fiction (winner)
2017 Andrew Carnegie Medal for Excellence in Fiction (Nominee)
2017 PEN/Faulkner Award for Fiction (Finalist)

References 

2016 American novels
HarperCollins books
Novels by Louise Erdrich
National Book Critics Circle Award-winning works
Novels set in North Dakota
Native American novels